Hendrik von Bültzingslöwen (born 16 June 1984) is a German actor.

Von Bültzingslöwen was born in Hamburg, West Germany in 1984. He is a member of the Bültzingslöwen family, which is part of the Thuringian nobility. He works as a film and television actor.

Filmography 
2006: big city robber (short film)
2007: A case for KBBG (short film)
2008: H3 – Halloween Horror Hostel
2009: Neues aus Büttenwarder
2009: The love and Viktor
2009: The waiting room
2009: Soul Kitchen
2011: Großstadtrevier (1 episode)
2011: SOKO Wismar (1 episode)
2011: Das Duo: Liebe und Tod
2012: Cheerful to deadly: Henker & Richter (1 episode)
2012: Alarm für Cobra 11 – Die Autobahnpolizei (1 episode)
2012: heart failure
2013: Turbo & Tacho (pilot film)
2014: Grand Budapest Hotel
2014: The unlikely events in the life of ...
2015: Sanctuary
2016: Tatort - Wrath of God
2016: Heldt (1 episode)
2017: jerks. (TV series, 10 episodes, supporting role as Jojo)
2017: Jürgen - Today is lived
2018: Wilsberg: Forecast murder
2018: SOKO Potsdam (TV series)
2017: Mata Hari - dance with death
2018: SOKO Cologne (TV series, episode: The Boule - Band e)

References 

Living people
21st-century German male actors
1984 births
Von Bültzingslöwen family
German untitled nobility
German male film actors
German male television actors
Male actors from Hamburg